Derivaldo Beserra Cavalcante, known as Dedé, (born 31 May 1987) is a Brazilian professional footballer who plays as a midfielder for Treze.

Career
Dedé was born in Fortaleza. In his early career with Ferroviário, he was loaned out to a number of clubs, playing in Campeonato Brasileiro Série B with Bahia and Fortaleza. He left Ferroviário to join Santa Cruz in 2010, and then Icasa later that year.

He went on to represent Bahia de Feira and Horizonte in Campeonato Brasileiro Série D in 2011 and 2012 respectively, and was part of the Campinense team which won the 2013 Copa do Nordeste before returning to Santa Cruz for a second spell which saw the club get promotion from 2013 Campeonato Brasileiro Série C

In 2014 he signed for Chapecoense, playing 19 times in 2014 Campeonato Brasileiro Série A. In 2015, despite Chapecoense wanting him to stay, he signed for Ponte Preta on a one-year deal. By May the same year he had moved to ABC for the 2015 Campeonato Brasileiro Série B season.

Dedé returned to Santa Cruz for a third spell at the start of 2016. In July 2016 he was loaned to Cuiabá for the remainder of the season. In 2017 he was contracted by Treze for Campeonato Paraibano, after which he signed for Portuguesa for 2017 Campeonato Brasileiro Série D. He returned to Treze for the 2018 season, playing in the Paraibano, 2018 Copa do Nordeste and most significantly, gaining promotion from 2018 Campeonato Brasileiro Série D. In the promotion-winning game, Dedé scored the winning goal against Caxias, and his celebrations in front of the Caxias fans. In the ensuing brawl, five players were sent off.

Dedé signed for Sampaio Corrêa in 2019, and returned to Treze again in 2020.

Honours
Santa Cruz
 Campeonato Brasileiro Série C: 2013
 Copa do Nordeste: 2016

Campinense
 Copa do Nordeste: 2013

References

External links
 
 Dedé at ZeroZero

Living people
1987 births
Association football midfielders
Brazilian footballers
Fortaleza Esporte Clube players
Ceará Sporting Club players
Ituano FC players
Esporte Clube Bahia players
Santa Cruz Futebol Clube players
Associação Desportiva Recreativa e Cultural Icasa players
Vila Nova Futebol Clube players
Associação Desportiva Bahia de Feira players
Campinense Clube players
Associação Chapecoense de Futebol players
Associação Atlética Ponte Preta players
ABC Futebol Clube players
Cuiabá Esporte Clube players
Treze Futebol Clube players
Associação Portuguesa de Desportos players
Sampaio Corrêa Futebol Clube players
Horizonte Futebol Clube players
Campeonato Brasileiro Série A players
Campeonato Brasileiro Série B players
Campeonato Brasileiro Série C players
Campeonato Brasileiro Série D players
Sportspeople from Fortaleza